is a railway station in the city of Yamagata, Yamagata Prefecture, Japan, operated by East Japan Railway Company (JR East).

Lines
Kita-Yamagata Station is served by the Ōu Main Line and Senzan Line, and is located 89.0 rail kilometers from the starting point of these lines at Fukushima Station. It also forms the terminus for the Aterazawa Line.

Station layout

The station is arranged in a "Y"-shaped configuration. The Ōu Main Line is served by a side platform and one side of an island platform. The other side of the island platform and an additional side platform are used by the Senzan Line. The Aterazawa Line connects to the station with a pair of opposed side platforms at an angle to the station building.

The station has a Midori no Madoguchi staffed ticket office.

Platforms

History
Kita-Yamagata Station opened on 20 July 1921 as a station on the Aterazawa light railway line. Services on the Ōu Main Line began on 11 September 1927 and on the Senzan West Line from 17 October 1933. The station was absorbed into the JR East network upon the privatization of JNR on 1 April 1987.

Passenger statistics
In fiscal 2018, the station was used by an average of 1590 passengers daily (boarding passengers only). The passenger figures for previous years are as shown below.

Surrounding area

 Manneken Pis in front of the east entrance
 Yamagata Civic Athletic Field
 Yamagata-ken Gokoku Shrine
 Chōkai Gassan Ryōshogū Shrine

See also
List of railway stations in Japan

References

External links

 JR East Station information 

Stations of East Japan Railway Company
Railway stations in Yamagata Prefecture
Ōu Main Line
Senzan Line
Aterazawa Line
Railway stations in Japan opened in 1921
Yamagata, Yamagata